Everyone's Hero is a 2006 American computer-animated sports comedy film directed by Christopher Reeve (in his final directed film after his death in 2004), Daniel St. Pierre, and Colin Brady. Starring the voices of Jake T. Austin, Rob Reiner, William H. Macy, Raven-Symoné and Whoopi Goldberg, the film was produced by IDT Entertainment in Toronto with portions outsourced to Reel FX Creative Studios. Distributed by 20th Century Fox, Everyone's Hero was released theatrically on September 15, 2006, to mixed reviews from critics and earned $16 million. It also marked the final film for Dana Reeve before her death in March 2006, six months before the release of the film.

Plot
In 1932 New York City during the Great Depression, Yankee Irving is a 10-year-old baseball fan but is picked on by the other kids for his poor skills. On that day, he finds a talking baseball he names Screwie, though other people can’t hear him. Yankee's father, Stanley, works as a custodian at Yankee Stadium. While the two are on the premises, a thief disguised as a security guard steals Babe Ruth's famous bat Darlin'. Stanley is falsely blamed and is temporarily dismissed until Darlin' can be found. Stanley foolishly blames Yankee for being alone in the locker room and setting him up. Stanley grounds him and sends him to his room, but the real thief is Lefty Maginnis, a cheating pitcher for the Chicago Cubs. Maginnis works for the Cubs' general manager Napoleon Cross, who desires to see the Cubs defeat the New York Yankees during the 1932 World Series.

Determined to reclaim the bat and save his family from being evicted and being out on the streets, Yankee goes to the train station and takes it from Maginnus, but fails to get off before the train takes them to another stop. Darlin’ the bat also has the ability to talk and urges Yankee to take her back to Babe Ruth in Chicago, where the next World Series game will be held. Unbeknownst to Yankee, Maginnis attempts to steal the bat from Yankee during a wild chase. Yankee decides to return Darlin’ to Babe Ruth and thereby clear his father's name and save his job. Yankee meets others who help him in his quest such as hobos Andy, Louis, and Jack, a girl named Marti Brewster, her baseball pitcher father Lonnie Brewster, who helps him drive to the city and teaches Yankee to set his feet right, and Babe Ruth himself. Maginnis steals Darlin and gives her to Cross, who kidnaps Yankee. During the game, Cross manipulates Yankee inside the office and reveals his plans to him.

After Yankee escapes the office, he evades several security guards, and finally gives Darlin’ back to Babe. Cross tries to talk Babe out of accepting the victory, saying that Yankee is too young to be a counting player. Despite this, Babe gives Yankee a confidence boost by telling him it’s not the bat, it’s the batter. Yankee manages to hit Screwie after two strikes. While the numerous Cubs players tried to strike Yankee out, he dodges and trips them. Maginnis tries to make his last attempts to strike him out, but Yankee manages to outsmart him by jumping over him (as payback for getting both him and Stanley in trouble) and landing on home plate, scoring a run. This restores the morale of the Yankees, who score seven more runs to take the lead and win the World Series.

The revelation of Darlin's theft leads to the arrest of Cross, who says that he was a fan that cheated. When his involvement as an accomplice and as a cheater is also revealed, Maginnis is kicked off the team and is also arrested. Stanley apologizes to Yankee for not listening to him earlier, while his name is cleared and is officially reinstated as the stadium's custodian. Yankee, his parents and his new baseball friends, Screwie and Darlin', celebrate the Yankees’ World Series win in a victory parade where he becomes an official player while Cross is handing out the Babe Ruth bobbleheads with Maginnis sweeping the streets as part of their work release. Yankee happily plays catch with Screwie and the hobos' dog.

Voice cast
 Jake T. Austin as Yankee Irving; a young 10-year-old boy who dreams of being a baseball player, looks up to his idol Babe Ruth, who saves his dashing and beautiful baseball bat, Darlin'.
 Rob Reiner as Screwie; a talking baseball who bickers over with his counterpart, Darlin'.
 Whoopi Goldberg as Darlin'; a talking baseball bat owned by Babe Ruth, Babe and Darlin' are inseparable, Babe takes her anywhere he goes, and will protect her at any costs. Darlin' loves her owner and feels safe around him.
 Robin Williams (uncredited) as Napoleon Cross; the corrupt general manager of the Chicago Cubs and Lefty's boss.
 William H. Macy as Lefty Maginnis; a cheating baseball pitcher who is sent by Napoleon Cross to try and steal Babe's bat, Darlin', and attempts revenge against Yankee for giving her to Babe.
 Brian Dennehy as Babe Ruth; the famous New York Yankees baseball player
 Raven-Symoné as Marti Brewster; Lonnie and Rosetta's daughter
 Mandy Patinkin as Stanley Irving; Yankee's father and the custodian at Yankee Stadium
 Forest Whitaker as Lonnie "The Rooster" Brewster; an African American king of the curve ball, who is the star pitcher for the Cincinnati Tigers and the father of Marti and the husband of Rosetta
 Dana Reeve as Emily Irving; Yankee's mother
 Robert Wagner as Mr. Robinson, the general manager of the New York Yankees and Stanley's boss
 Richard Kind as Hobo Andy / Maitre'D
 Joe Torre as New York Yankees manager
 Cherise Booth as Rosetta Brewster, Lonnie's wife and Marti's mother
 Ritchie Allen as Officer Bryant
 Jason Harris Katz (credited as Jason Harris) as Announcer
 Ed Helms as Hobo Louie
 Ray Iannicelli as Conductors/Umpire
 Gideon Jacobs as Bully Kid Tubby
 Marcus Maurice as Willie
 Will Reeve as Big Kid
 Ron Tippe as Hobo Jack
 Jesse Bronstein as Sandlot Kid #1
 Ralph Coppola as Sandlot Kid #2
 Conor White as Bully Kid Arnold

Home media
Everyone's Hero was released on DVD on March 20, 2007, by 20th Century Fox Home Entertainment. The movie was released on Blu-ray on March 5, 2013, and is exclusive to Walmart stores. The movie premiered on Disney+ on 7 May 2021, in Canada and the United States; prior to then it was available from launch on HBO Max.

Reception

Box office
In its opening weekend, the film grossed $6.1 million in 2,896 theaters in the United States and Canada, ranking #3 at the box office, behind Gridiron Gang and The Black Dahlia. By the end of its run, Everyone's Hero grossed $14.5 million in the US and $2.1 million internationally, for an approximate total of $16.6 million worldwide.

Critical reception
  Audiences polled by CinemaScore gave the film an average grade of "A–" on an A+ to F scale.

Jack Matthews of the New York Daily News wrote, "Whoever wanders into the theater should leave a winner". L.A. Weekly called the themes "fairly pro forma" and cited the film's "antique Rockwellian look" as "its greatest pleasure". Gregory Kirschling of Entertainment Weekly rated it B− and wrote, "Everyone's Hero re-creates Depression-era America with surprisingly agreeable anachronistic panache", though he criticized the character designs.

The Austin Chronicle primarily criticized Everyone's Hero for focusing too much on sentimentality over entertaining moments. Tasha Robinson of The A.V. Club opined the film "ranges from improbable to nonsensical to just plain dull. [...] The lame banter, the one-note characters, the predictable clumsy stabs at emotional uplift, or the booger jokes [don't help]." Screwie and Darlin were bashed on in a review by The Washington Posts Stephen Hunter, panning their inability to "move or express emotion;" and Slant Magazines Ed Gonzalez disliked the lack of reasoning for anthropomorphic baseball gear for being "random." The anachronisms, such as its out-of-time slang, pop-song-dominated soundtrack, and use of an African-American-voiced talking bat, were also panned, with Gonzalez even calling the Great Depression setting "nonexistent."

The story did have its supporters. Variety reviewer Joe Leydon lukewarmly honored Everyone's Hero as a "modestly engaging mix of broad comedy and nostalgic fable," picaresque plot and the inclusion of a Negro leagues player; however, in addition to disliking its gross-out humor, he questioned the rejection of segregation that occurred in the 1930s era the film is set in. He also suggested the film would have a hard time selling to children: "the toon’s target demo — i.e., toddlers and grade-schoolers — are too young to know about the Reeves, and pic could be a hard sell to youngsters who aren't baseball fanatics and recognize Babe Ruth only as the name of a candy bar." Seattle Post-Intelligencer writer Manny Lewis concluded that "the film certainly will appeal to kids; with its beating-the-odds theme and its dramatic finale involving a crucial at-bat in the World Series, it is reminiscent of a boyhood daydream." Orlando Sentinel film critic Roger Moore  concluded that "the kids will laugh and there's enough heart in Everyone's Hero to bring it over the plate -- barely." MaryAnn Johanson similarly spotlighted the "sweet gentleness" and "can-do-it-iveness" that made its otherwise typical children's film plot stand out. Time Out London applauded the characters, especially Screwie, which recouped for its "lacking" amount of tension.

The visuals garnered a mixed response, Robinson calling the animation "bland" and "generic" and Leydon "herky-jerky." Lewis found Screwie and Darlin's visual gags "stale" but praised those of Lefty, reasoning "his flailing limbs giving him a clumsy grace far more entertaining to watch than either the ball or the bat." Hunter acclaimed the animation as "quite advanced, bringing emotional subtleties, vivid eye dilations and expressions and complex movements to exceptional life"; while Moore opined "the animated people look plastic, but the backdrops are pretty, and the slapstick bits are a 'stitch'."

The voice acting was praised.

Syndication
In the United States, FX aired Everyone's Hero on July 12, 2009. In the United States, Telemundo aired the film on October 4, 2009. In Latin America, Cartoon Network Latino aired the film on November 23, 2011. In Asia, Disney Channel premiered May 29, 2012. In the United States, FXM aired the film on June 16, 2012. It also aired on Disney XD in the United States on April 8, 2013, and March 30, 2014. It also aired on Cartoon Network in the United States on November 5, 2016.

Upon its launch in May 2020, the movie was available to stream on HBO Max as part of a longtime distribution deal the HBO network had made with Fox; the deal was still enacted even after the acquisition of 21st Century Fox by Disney, which had its own streaming service, Disney+. However, on May 7, 2021, the film had moved from HBO Max to Disney+, though it's since been removed from the latter service as of September 2021 in the United States, but still available internationally.

Soundtrack

The soundtrack, released on the Columbia Records/Sony Music Soundtrax labels, features tracks by the star of the film Raven-Symoné, Grammy-winners Wyclef Jean, Brooks & Dunn, Mary Chapin Carpenter, and various other artists.

See also
 List of animated feature films
 List of computer-animated films

References

External links
 
 
 

2006 films
2006 computer-animated films
2000s American animated films
2000s fantasy adventure films
2000s sports comedy films
American baseball films
American children's animated adventure films
American children's animated fantasy films
American computer-animated films
American sports comedy films
Animated films about children
Animated films set in New York City
Baseball animation
Films set in Chicago
Films set in Illinois
Films set in Pennsylvania
Films set in Toledo, Ohio
Films set in the 1930s
Films set in 1932
Films about the New York Yankees
Cultural depictions of Babe Ruth
20th Century Fox animated films
20th Century Fox films
Films scored by John Debney
Films directed by Christopher Reeve
Reel FX Creative Studios films
2006 comedy films
2000s English-language films